Blackwater River State Forest is a State Forest in the western panhandle of Florida. It is administered by the Florida Forest Service, part of the Florida Department of Agriculture and Consumer Services. Blackwater River State Forest is completely contained within Santa Rosa and Okaloosa Counties. The forest is managed from a common headquarters in Munson, Florida. There are local ranger offices in Molino (Escambia County), Milton, (Santa Rosa County), and Baker (Okaloosa County).

Name 
The forest shares its name with the Blackwater River, which rises in southern Alabama and flows south dividing Okaloosa and Santa Rosa before emptying into the Blackwater Bay.

History 
Otahite was one of the settlements that preceded the forest. It is now a ghost town but its post office was relocated and is part of a museum. State legislator John Wilkinson Jr. was documented as being from Otahite.

Federal Forest and Department of Defense land was originally donated to the state of Florida in the 1950s to manage for timber and recreation. These tracts of land comprised close to 50,000 acres of primarily Longleaf, Slash, and Loblolly pine plantations with scattered scrub resulting from years of mismanagement. Over time multiple acquisitions have been made to extend the size of the forests. Most of the additions have been from purchasing private timber company land while others have come from smaller private land owners.

Recreation 
The forest offers many recreational opportunities. Multiple camping areas, both developed and primitive are located throughout the forest. Krul Campground has two camp grounds and a day use area. Bear Lake Campground has a campground with water and power and a second campground with only water for tent campers. There is also a pavilion available for use at Bear Lake. To the North is Hurricane Lake with a campground on the north and south shores. The south campground does not have electricity at its campsites. All lakes, excluding Krul lake, are open for fishing and are managed and stocked by the Florida Fish and Wildlife Conservation Commission.

See also
Blackwater River State Park
Conecuh National Forest

References

External links 
 Blackwater River State Forest – Florida Forest Service

Florida state forests
Protected areas of Santa Rosa County, Florida
Protected areas of Okaloosa County, Florida